KNLM may refer to:

 KLNM-LD, a Texan TV station
 The Kulturhistorisk leksikon for nordisk middelalder, an encyclopaedia